McCormick's Creek State Park Entrance and Gatehouse is a historic gatehouse located at McCormick's Creek State Park in Washington Township, Owen County, Indiana.  It was built by the Civilian Conservation Corps in 1935, and is a one-story, "T"-shaped, Rustic style limestone building with a gable roof. The building features a large limestone fireplace chimney and open entrance porch. The gatehouse is bracketed by a contributing stone and timber fence in two sections.

It was listed on the National Register of Historic Places in 1993.

References

Civilian Conservation Corps in Indiana
Park buildings and structures on the National Register of Historic Places in Indiana
Buildings and structures completed in 1935
Buildings and structures in Owen County, Indiana
National Register of Historic Places in Owen County, Indiana
National Park Service Rustic architecture